This list of Sempervivoideae genera shows the genera within the Crassulaceae subfamily Sempervivoideae, of which there are about 30. A number of these have been at times, embedded within the very large genus Sedum s.s..

Alphabetical list of genera 

 Aeonium
 Aichryson
 Cremnophila
 Dudleya
 Echeveria
 Graptopetalum
 Hylotelephium
 Kungia
 Lenophyllum
 Meterostachys
 Monanthes
 Mucizonia
 Orostachys
 Pachyphytum
 Perrierosedum
 Petrosedum
 Phedimus
 Pistorinia
 Prometheum
 Pseudosedum
 Rhodiola
 Rosularia
 Sedella
 Sedum
 Sempervivum
 Sinocrassula
 Thompsonella 
 Umbilicus
 Villadia

The genus Sedum constitutes about 50% of the species of the family Crassulaceae.

References

Bibliography 

  (full text at ResearchGate)
 
 

Crassulaceae
Lists of plant genera (alphabetic)